Kimberly Duane Mulkey (born May 17, 1962) is an American college basketball player and coach. She is the head coach for Louisiana State University's women's basketball team. A Pan-American gold medalist in 1983 and Olympic gold medalist in 1984, she became the first person in NCAA women's basketball history to win a national championship as a player, assistant coach, and head coach. She won three NCAA championships as the coach of Baylor in 2005, 2012, and 2019. Mulkey was inducted into the Women's Basketball Hall of Fame in 2020 and was also inducted into the Naismith Memorial Basketball Hall of Fame.

Youth
Kim Mulkey was one of the first girls in the US to play organized basketball with boys.  After playing basketball at Nesom Junior High School in Tickfaw, Louisiana, she led her Hammond High School basketball team to four consecutive state championships.  As high school valedictorian, she posted a perfect 4.0 GPA. She later achieved high academic honors as an inductee into the College Sports Information Directors of America Academic Hall of Fame for her classroom achievements at Louisiana Tech.

Louisiana Tech
The  Mulkey was an All-American point guard at Louisiana Tech University, winning two national championships as a player—the AIAW title in 1981 and the inaugural NCAA title in 1982—and in 1984 was the inaugural winner of the women's version of the Frances Pomeroy Naismith Award, given to the nation's top college senior under 5'6"/1.68 m (the height limit was later raised to 5'8"/1.73 m). She became an assistant at Tech in 1985 and was promoted to associate head coach in 1996. During her 15-year tenure as assistant and associate head coach under Leon Barmore, Louisiana Tech posted a 430–68 record and advanced to seven Final Fours. Mulkey and the Lady Techsters won the 1988 NCAA Championship.

USA Basketball

Mulkey was selected to be a member of the team representing the US at the 1983 Pan American Games held in Caracas, Venezuela. The team won all five games to earn the gold medal for the event. Mulkey averaged 12.4 points per game.

Mulkey played for the USA National team in the 1983 World Championships, held in Sao Paulo, Brazil. The team won six games, but lost two against the Soviet Union. In an opening round game, the USA team had a nine-point lead at halftime, but the Soviets came back to take the lead, and a final shot by the USA failed to drop, leaving the USSR team with a one-point victory 85–84. The USA team won their next four games, setting up the gold medal game against USSR. This game was also close, and was tied at 82 points each with six seconds to go in the game. The Soviets Elena Chausova received the inbounds pass and hit the game winning shot in the final seconds, giving the USSR team the gold medal with a score of 84–82. The USA team earned the silver medal. Mulkey averaged 3.1 points per game.

In 1984, the USA sent its National team to the 1984 William Jones Cup competition in Taipei, Taiwan, for pre-Olympic practice. The team easily beat each of the eight teams they played, winning by an average of just under 50 points per game. Mulkey averaged 6.8 points per game.

She continued with the national team to represent the US at the 1984 Olympics. The team won all six games to claim the gold medal. Mulkey averaged 5.3 points per game.

Coaching career

Baylor 

In 2000, Mulkey took over a Baylor program that had finished the 1999–2000 season 7–20 and last in the Big 12 Conference, and had never received an invite to the NCAA tournament. In her first season at Baylor, she led the Lady Bears program to its first NCAA tournament bid; the Lady Bears have gone to postseason play every year since Mulkey's arrival.  They have won at least 20 games every year, and only once has the team lost more than 10 games in a season. The rise of the Baylor program under Mulkey was capped off in 2005 with a national title when the Bears defeated Michigan State in the championship game at Indianapolis. This made her the first woman to have won NCAA Division I basketball titles as a player and a head coach, and only the fourth person (after Joe B. Hall, Bob Knight and Dean Smith).

Since the inception of the NCAA women's tournament in 1982, Mulkey has been involved in that tournament as a player or coach every year except 1985 and 2003. She was enshrined in the Women's Basketball Hall of Fame in 2000 for her accomplishments as a player.

Mulkey in 2007 signed a 10-year extension to remain Baylor's coach. Her autobiography is called Won't Back Down: Teams, Dreams and Family.

In 2012, Mulkey made NCAA history by leading the Lady Bears to a perfect 40–0 season, the most wins in college basketball history, men or women. The season culminated at the NCAA Championship game in Denver, where the Lady Bears defeated Notre Dame.

In 2019, in a repeat of the 2012 NCAA Championship game, the Baylor Lady Bears defeated the Notre Dame Fighting Irish by a score of 82–81 in Tampa. This made Mulkey the third coach to win three or more NCAA Division I women's basketball championships, joining Connecticut's Geno Auriemma (11) and Tennessee's Pat Summitt (8).

Mulkey is well known for her "bold" sense of fashion. She once wore a snakeskin print to a game against Connecticut; her wardrobe choices have generated a multitude of strong responses online.

During the COVID-19 pandemic 
While the 2020 NCAA tournament was cancelled due to the COVID-19 pandemic, Baylor made it to the Elite Eight of the 2021 tournament, held in an event isolation "bubble". During the Elite Eight round, Mulkey advocated ending COVID-19 testing on the tournament players despite the ongoing pandemic. She stated that the organization tasked with running the student tournament should "dump the COVID testing", commenting freely during a press conference despite not being asked about it by reporters. She then stated more fully that, "Wouldn’t it be a shame to keep COVID testing, and then you got kids [testing] positive or something, and they don't get to play in the Final Four? So you need to just forget the COVID tests and let the four teams that are playing in each Final Four go battle it out." Mulkey herself had tested positive for the virus earlier in the season, and made the comments following her team's loss to UConn; a team which Baylor was supposed to face earlier in the season but was cancelled due to Mulkey's COVID diagnosis. According to CBS News, her comments were later described by "many basketball fans" as "misinformed, dangerous and irresponsible". Connecticut head coach Geno Auriemma later defended Mulkey's comments, stating, "This past year has shown us that there's a lot of difficult topics to talk about".

Louisiana State University 
After 21 seasons as the head coach at Baylor, Mulkey was announced as head coach at LSU on April 25, 2021.

Personal life
In 1987, Mulkey married Randy Robertson, whom she had met at Louisiana Tech and had been the starting quarterback for the Bulldogs for the 1974 and 1975 seasons. The couple have two children together: son Kramer, a professional baseball player and collegiate All-American at Louisiana State University, and daughter Makenzie, who played both basketball and softball for Baylor and is now an assistant coach on her mother's staff. During her marriage to Robertson, she was known as Kim Mulkey-Robertson. Mulkey and Robertson divorced in 2006.

She spent her childhood in Tickfaw, Louisiana.

Head coaching record

 

Source:

Awards and honors
 2012 — Russell Athletic/WBCA National Coach of the Year
 2012 — Associated Press College Basketball Coach of the Year
 2019 — Associated Press College Basketball Coach of the Year
 2021 — Associated Press College Basketball Coach of the Year

References

External links
 Baylor profile

1962 births
Living people
American women's basketball coaches
American women's basketball players
Baptists from Louisiana
Basketball coaches from Louisiana
Basketball players at the 1983 Pan American Games
Basketball players at the 1984 Summer Olympics
Basketball players from Louisiana
Baylor Bears women's basketball coaches
Hammond High School (Louisiana) alumni
Louisiana Tech Lady Techsters basketball coaches
Louisiana Tech Lady Techsters basketball players
LSU Lady Tigers basketball coaches
Medalists at the 1984 Summer Olympics
Naismith Memorial Basketball Hall of Fame inductees
Olympic gold medalists for the United States in basketball
Parade High School All-Americans (girls' basketball)
People from Tangipahoa Parish, Louisiana
Point guards
Sportspeople from Santa Ana, California
Pan American Games competitors for the United States
United States women's national basketball team players